is an interchange railway station on the Tōkaidō Main Line in the city of  Numazu, Shizuoka, Japan, operated by Central Japan Railway Company (JR Central). The station is also a freight terminal and rail yard for the Japan Freight Railway Company (JR Freight).

Lines
Numazu Station is served by the Tōkaidō Main Line and the Gotemba Line.

Station layout

Numazu Station has three ground-level island platforms serving six tracks, connected to each other and to the station building by both a footbridge and an underpass. The station building has automated ticket machines, TOICA automated turnstiles and a "JR Ticket office" staffed ticket office.

Platforms

History

Numazu Station opened on February 1, 1889 when the section of the Tōkaidō Main Line connecting Shizuoka with Kōzu was completed. A spur line to nearby Numazu Port was established in 1899. The first station building burned down in a fire of 1913 and the second in a fire of 1926. On December 1, 1934, Numazu was connected directly with Atami Station via the Tanna Tunnel, thus eliminating the previous long detour north to Gotemba Station in the section between Tokyo and Shizuoka. Numazu Station was rebuilt in 1937, but was burned down again, this time in the Bombing of Numazu in World War II. The next station building was erected in 1953, and rebuilt in 1973.

Station numbering was introduced to this station in 2018; Numazu Station was assigned station numbers CA04 for the Tōkaidō Line and CB18 for the Gotemba Line.

Bus terminals

Highway buses (north exit) 
 Airport Liousine; For Narita International Airport (Fujikyu Shizuoka Bus, Keisei Bus)
 Sansan Numazu Tokyo; For Kasumigaseki Station, Tokyo Station (Fujikyu City Bus)
 Sansan Numazu Shinjuku / Mishima Croquette; For Shibuya Station, Shinjuku Station (Keio Bus East, Fujikyu City Bus)
 Kintaro; For Kyōto Station, Ōsaka Station, Ōsaka Namba Station, Ōsaka Abenobashi Station (Fujikyu Shonan Bus, Kintetsu Bus)
 Hakata Fujiyama Express; For Kokura Station, Nishitetsu Fukuoka (Tenjin) Station, Hakata Station (Fujikyu Yamanashi Bus, Nishi-Nippon Railroad)

Passenger statistics
In fiscal 2017, the station was used by an average of 20,941 passengers daily (boarding passengers only).

Surrounding area
Numazu Station is located in central Numazu city.

See also
 List of Railway Stations in Japan

References

Yoshikawa, Fumio. Tokaido-sen 130-nen no ayumi. Grand-Prix Publishing (2002) .

External links

 JR Central station information 

Railway stations in Japan opened in 1889
Railway stations in Shizuoka Prefecture
Gotemba Line
Tōkaidō Main Line
Stations of Central Japan Railway Company
Stations of Japan Freight Railway Company
Numazu, Shizuoka